

News

January
1 – Maryline Salvetat wins the first race of 2007, the Grand Prix du Nouvel-An held in Pétange. She finished the race 25 seconds ahead of World Champion and 2006 winner Marianne Vos, while Daphny van den Brand followed in third position. velostory.net
7 – Loes Sels, Maryline Salvetat, Hanka Kupfernagel, Helen Wyman and Daphny van den Brand are crowned as the new national champions of the top nations in the sport. For Van den Brand it was the ninth time in her career. dewielersite.net
14 – Laurence Leboucher wins the World Cup meeting in her home nation France. In the Grand Prix Nommay she was faster than her French colleague Maryline Salvetat. Hanka Kupfernagel, who finished in third position remains the World Cup leader. cyclingnews.com
28 – Maryline Salvetat claims the rainbow jersey as she keeps a slight gap to Katie Compton who takes the silver with the top favourites unable to win any medal. cyclingnews.com

World championships

World Cup

Superprestige

Gazet van Antwerpen

Other 2007 Cyclo-cross races

National championships

 
Cyclo-cross by year